George R. Brunjes (April 24, 1889 – December 1, 1968) was a Democratic one term mayor of Norwalk, Connecticut, USA from 1955 to 1957 and principal of Franklin Junior High School.

Political career 
In 1955, Brunjes ran for mayor against the three-term incumbent mayor, Irving Freese, and the previous Republican candidate Stanley Stroffolino who was running under the Independent Taxpayers Party. Brunjes beat Stroffolino by 2,157 votes.

He lost his re-election attempt in 1957 to Freese. After his term, he served on the City Hall Building Committee. He died at a convalescent home in Norwalk in 1968.

References 

1889 births
1968 deaths
Connecticut Democrats
Mayors of Norwalk, Connecticut
American school principals
20th-century American politicians